This article lists political parties in South Sudan.

Parties represented in the Transitional National Legislative Assembly

Parties not represented in the Transitional National Legislative Assembly
People's United Forum (2022-present)
Kush Democratic Majority Party
South Sudan Liberal Party (2010–present)
Communist Party of South Sudan (2011–present)
South Sudan African National Congress (2006–present)
United Democratic Front
Freedom Democratic Party (2020-present FDP)

Defunct parties
 African People's Progressive Alliance
 South Sudan People's Liberal Party PLP

See also 
 Politics of South Sudan
 List of political parties by country

Sudan
 
Political parties
South Sudan
Political parties